Freedia Got a Gun is a World of Wonder documentary film starring Big Freedia and directed by Chris McKim. Fenton Bailey, Randy Barbato and McKim served as producers. The 85-minute film focuses on gun violence and follows Freedia as he revisits his New Orleans hometown.

Freedia's younger brother, Adam Ross, was murdered by gun violence in 2018, inspiring him to make the film.

The film's world premiere was at the 2020 Tribeca Film Festival. It also aired at the AFI Docs Film Festival in June 2020. The film streamed on Peacock in October 2020.

Awards and reception 
The film was awarded the 2020 Award for Freedom at the Outfest Film Festival. It was reviewed as a "call to action"  and The New York Times said "Freedia's beguiling charisma carries the film, and it makes the case that her impressive power, in conjunction with collective action, could help carry a movement, too."

References 

2020 films
2020 documentary films
American documentary films
Films set in New Orleans
Films shot in New Orleans
2020s English-language films
2020s American films